The KrAZ-255 is a Ukrainian (formerly Soviet) three-axle off-road truck with six-wheel drive (6 × 6), intended for extreme operations. It was manufactured at the KrAZ plant beginning from 1967.

The KrAZ-255 was developed directly from its predecessor, the KrAZ-214 (produced 1956-1967). Despite being very similar at first glance (both using the same cab, flatbed as well as the suspension), there are few major differences. Firstly, the 255 used new and much more powerful engine - the YaMZ-238 (same used in MT-LB tracked APC), replacing the previously used and sensibly weaker YaAZ-206B which was used in 214. The 255 also featured new and more reliable transmission, the YaMZ-236N, instead of the previously used YaAZ-204. It also featured new headlights (which were now, together with turn signals, located in their own housings mounted on the fenders) and, most notably, much wider tires (1300 x 530 x 533 in dimensions), which offered lighter ground pressure and thus, even greater off-road capabilities when compared to its predecessor.

Along with Ural, ZiL, Kamaz, GAZ and MAZ, the KrAZ once represented one of six models of cargo/towing trucks (in its basic version, the KrAZ-255B) used by the Soviet Armed Forces, as well as by many civilian organizations  in the former Soviet Union (mainly by various construction plants), where it was also used as a logging (the KrAZ-255L/L1) and dump truck (the KrAZ-256).

In contrast to other above mentioned models (with the exception of MAZ), the KrAZ was the only which was never produced inside Russia (then Russian Soviet Federative Socialist Republic), since it was manufactured exclusively in then Ukrainian Soviet Socialist Republic (nowadays Ukraine), at the city of Kremenchuk.

Since the KrAZ-255 was the heaviest (weighing 12 tons empty) and most powerful (using a 14,900 ccm engine, producing 240 hp/180 kw) of all Soviet three-axle (6 × 6) military cargo trucks, it was most often used for towing heavier artillery pieces (such as D-74, M-46 and 2A65 howitzers or T-12 anti-tank gun) and also for towing various aircraft from their hangars to runways, or vice versa (in tractor-unit version, the KrAZ-255V).

Furthemore, it was also used as a platform for control cabin and the antennas of PRV-9/1RL19 Naklon (NATO reporting name: "Thin-Skin") and PRV-16/1RL132 Nadyozhnost (NATO reporting name: "Odd-Pair") Soviet height-finding radars, as well as for various engineer duties in specially-designed versions (such as PMP collapsible ferryboat intended to be used as a pontoon bridge and TMM-3 mobile bridgelayer), which are still being used today by various military forces across the globe.

The KrAZ-255 ultimately evolved into a new model as its successor in 1979, the KrAZ-260, whose only difference was a new design of cab and the interiors. Despite that however, the KrAZ-260 did not replace it in production, but was actually produced alongside it up until 1994, when both were finally discontinued in favor to KrAZ-6322 (a modernized model of KrAZ-260), which is still being produced today in Ukraine.

Technical characteristics 
Engine: 14.86 L diesel 8 cyl.
Power: 240 PS /2100 rpm
Torque: 883 Nm /1500 rpm
Top speed: 71 km/h (44 mph)

Variants 
 KrAZ-255B (КрАЗ-255Б) - 12-ton cargo truck Mass production started since 8 August 1967
 KrAZ-255B1 (КрАЗ-255Б1) - cargo truck, mass production started since 1979
 KrAZ-255V (КрАЗ-255В) - tractor unit
 KrAZ-255L (КрАЗ-255Л) - 23-ton log truck
 KrAZ-255L1 (КрАЗ-255Л1) - log truck, mass production started since 1980
 KrAZ-256 (КрАЗ-256) - 12-ton dump truck
 ATZ-8,5 (АТЗ-8,5) - fuel tanker on KrAZ-255 chassis
 КS-3572 (КС-3572) - military crane on KrAZ-255 chassis
 EOV-4421 (ЭОВ-4421) - military excavator on KrAZ-255 chassis
 ТММ-3 (Tyazhyolyy Mekhanizirovannyy Most) - bridgelayer on KrAZ-255 chassis, since 1974
 PMP (Pontonno-Mostovoy Park) - pontoon bridge on KrAZ-255 chassis
 PRV-9 and PRV-16 (Podvizhnyy Radiolokatsionnyy Vysotomer) - height-finding radars on KrAZ-255 chassis.
 122mm BM-21 Grad on KrAZ-255 chassis - several vehicles were made in Tajikistan
 Jupiter - 130mm self-propelled gun (a Soviet 130mm field gun M-46 on KrAZ-255B chassis), several vehicles were made in Cuba
 PTH130-K255B - 130mm self-propelled gun (a Soviet 130mm field gun M-46 on KrAZ-255B chassis). One test prototype was made in Vietnam

Operators

Current operators
  - Armed Forces of Belarus
 
  - Hungarian Armed Forces
  - Cuban Revolutionary Armed Forces
 
 
  - In April 2016, it was announced that Armed Forces of the Republic of Kazakhstan would begin replacing KrAZ-255B trucks with new KamAZ trucks
 
  - Armed Forces of the Republic of Moldova
 
 
  - 4 were allocated to the Bucharest public transport company in 1978 serving as recovery vehicles for buses, trams and trolleybuses, where they remained in service until 2007, when one was cut and disposed and the other 3 retired
  - Russian Armed Forces
  - Serbian Armed Forces
  - Armed Forces of the Republic of Tajikistan
  - Ukrainian Armed Forces

Former operators
 
 
 : Finnish Army

Gallery

References

KrAZ vehicles
Military trucks of the Soviet Union
Military trucks of Ukraine
Military vehicles introduced in the 1960s